Telemetry of a Fallen Angel is the second studio album by The Crüxshadows, released on CD in 1995.

Track listing

Versions
There are four different versions of this album:
 The first version was released in 1995 under their own label, Black Widow Music.
 The second version was released in 1996 under the label, Nesak International.
 The third version was released in 1998 under the label, Dancing Ferret Discs.
 The fourth and last version was released in 2004. All of the songs were remastered and there was a bonus track included: Marilyn, my Bitterness V2.0 Radio Edit.

Credits
 Artwork [Album And Monsters Collage] – Mandem
 Backing Vocals – Rogue, Sean Flanagan, Tim Curry
 Cover, Drums [Kawai], Remastered By, Vocals, Violin – Rogue
 Design, Layout – Jen Jawidzik, Rogue, Sean Goebel
 Drums [Roland], Keyboards, Sampler, Sequenced By – Sean Flanagan
 Guitar – Tim Curry 
 Photography By [Band] – Jessica Lackey
 Producer – Angel Kane, The Crüxshadows

The Crüxshadows albums
1995 albums